The National Museum-Memorial of Victims of the Occupation Regimes, or the Prison on Łącki (Street) (Tyurma na Lontskoho) is a former detention center in Lviv that throughout the 20th century was primarily used as a political prison of the Polish, Soviet and Nazi regimes.

The museum houses a main office of the Center for Research of Liberation Movement.

Name
The prison's name comes the former name of the street upon which the main entrance was located. Formerly known in Polish as ulica Eliasza Łąckiego (Łącki Street), and today known in Ukrainian as vulytsia Karla Bryullova (Bryullov Street), the road is a side street of the main thoroughfare, vulytsia Stepana Bandery (Bandera Street). Łącki Street was named after Eliasz Łącki who was a Polish war hero of the 1672-76 Polish–Ottoman War during the 1672 siege of Lwów.

History
The building complex was built in 1889-1890 at the intersection of ulica Sapiehy (today vulytsia Bandery) and ulica Kopernika on the project of architect Józef Kajetan Janowski. It is built in a Neo-Renaissance style and originally was designed for Austro-Hungarian Gendarmerie's main office in the city. The portion where the prison was actually located was built soon after World War I in 1918-1920 when Lviv was part of the Second Polish Republic.

The prison portion housed the Fourth Department of the State Police Main Commandant's Office, one duty of which included a fight against "anti-government" organizations such as Organization of Ukrainian Nationalists, Communist Party of Western Ukraine and others. Unofficially the prison was intended for political prisoners. In 1935 the investigating department of police were quartered in the building, while the prison was turned into a detention center.

With the start of World War II in 1939 and partition of the Second Polish Republic between Nazi Germany and Soviet Union, the prison was transformed into the NKVD Prison No.1 which was designed to accommodate 1,500 prisoners. The regional administration of NKVD took up quarters in the building. 

During 1941-1944 the building was used as a Gestapo detention center and housed an office of Einsatzgruppen of Sicherheitsdienst (SD). From July 21 to 26, 1941 former Polish Prime Minister Kazimierz Bartel was imprisoned here.

Gallery

See also
 House of Terror
 Brygidki
Lviv pogroms (1941)

References

External links
 Official website
 Official website of the Center for Research of Liberation Movement
 Map of the former Łąckoho street in Lviv
 Pavlyshyn, A. History of one jail. Prison on Łąckiego: whose truth is more? (Історія однієї в’язниці. Тюрма на Лонцького: чиєї правди більше?) The Ukrainian Week. 24 September 2010.
 Bilan, B. Prison on Łąckiego. Liberation from death. ZIK. 27 September 2012.
 Prison at Łąckiego at the Istorychna Pravda (Ukrayinska Pravda)

History of Lviv
Renaissance Revival architecture in Ukraine
Museums in Lviv
History museums in Ukraine
Prisons in the Soviet Union
Second Polish Republic
Museums of communism
Museums established in 2009
2009 establishments in Ukraine
Frankivskyi District (Lviv)
Prison museums in Europe
Defunct prisons in Ukraine